The Understudy is a 1976 Australian television film directed by Eric Luithle and starring John McTernan, Jeanie Drynan, Don Barkham, and Ivar Kants. It is about a film within a film.

References

External links

Australian television films
1976 television films
1976 films
1970s English-language films
1970s Australian films